Hypserpa is a genus of flowering plants belonging to the family Menispermaceae.

Its native range is Tropical and Subtropical Asia to Western Pacific.

Species:

Hypserpa ademae 
Hypserpa calcicola 
Hypserpa decumbens 
Hypserpa laurina 
Hypserpa mackeei 
Hypserpa neocaledonica 
Hypserpa nitida 
Hypserpa polyandra 
Hypserpa smilacifolia 
Hypserpa vieillardii

References

 
Menispermaceae genera